Ranked is a musical written by David Taylor Gomes (music and lyrics) and Kyle Holmes (book), known as "Holmes & Gomes". The musical focuses on a dystopian world where academic competition defines each student's worth, and students do whatever it takes to get to the top of the leaderboards, including paying for their grades. Holmes & Gomes started writing in the spring of 2018, and Ranked debuted on April 4, 2019 at Granite Bay High School just weeks after the 2019 college admissions bribery scandal broke, launching the show into a national spotlight.

Background
Holmes & Gomes started writing Ranked for their students at Granite Bay High School in the spring of 2018. Holmes has been the director of theatre arts at Granite Bay High School since 2012, and Gomes is a local composer and musician who serves as the high school theatre program's musical director each spring. They had previously collaborated on a serial musical called Boxed Up at the Sacramento Warehouse Artist Lofts. Holmes & Gomes chose to focus their new musical on academic pressure because that is the story their students wanted to tell. They stated the intent behind the musical was to shine a light on "a system that puts an insurmountable amount of pressure on our teenagers to be successful, and when we say success what we really mean is – better than everyone else [...] and for a lot of our students, that's not the reality of what living a happy and successful life is."

Holmes & Gomes looked at examples of people, especially adults, achieving academic success by any means necessary, such as the Atlanta Public Schools cheating scandal and the District of Columbia Public Schools graduation scandal. They also looked at unique ways of obtaining success in schools, like some Chinese schools using a "grade bank".

One of Holmes & Gomes's goals was to create a story that took student experiences seriously and did not present them as caricatures dealing with meaningless problems. Some of the musical's dialogue is taken directly from student experiences and writing.

Coincidentally, Rick Singer, the mastermind behind the 2019 college admission bribery scandal, worked with the Granite Bay High School community a decade prior to Ranked being written. Holmes did not arrive at Granite Bay High School until 2011.

Productions
Granite Bay High School's production ran from April 4 until April 13, 2019. The performance was directed by book writer Kyle Holmes, and musically directed by composer David Taylor Gomes.

The Granite Bay High School cast held an encore concert-style performance on June 8, 2019 at the historic Crest Theater in Downtown Sacramento. The performance was directed by Joelle Robertson.

In August 2019, Ranked was further developed at the UC Davis Department of Theatre and Dance's third annual Ground and Field Theatre Festival. The production was directed and choreographed by Broadway veteran Mindy Cooper, and starred Chloe Boyan from the original Granite Bay High School cast, and Shelby Wulfert, from Disney Channel's Liv and Maddie.

The show is currently running at Grant's Pass High School, from November 4th 2022 to November 9th 2022. It's being directed by Julia Cuppy, with around 30 actors participating, and about 10 crew members helping with mics, lights, etc.

The show is currently being licensed by high schools across the country, having already mounted productions at Davis Senior High School, Narragansett High School, Cupertino High School, and Princeton Day School.

On February 21, 2020, it was announced that the presentation would be filmed as part of an HBO documentary.

A 29-hour industry reading of Ranked was scheduled to be presented in New York City on March 20, 2020 in an attempt to secure a lead producer for the project. The reading was to be managed by Daryl Roth Theatrical Management, and held at the Daryl Roth Theatre. The presentation was cast by Stephanie Klapper Casting, and auditions were filmed as part of the HBO project. The cast was announced on March 11, 2020. On March 12, 2020 the Ranked social media announced that the reading would be postponed, presumably as a result of the coronavirus outbreak.

Recordings 
Ranked, A Musical Concept Album was released on February 28, 2020. The album was mixed and mastered by Andrew Heringer. All proceeds from the album are being donated to the Sugarloaf Station Foundation 501(c)(3).

Cast

Response
The production received positive reviews. Courtney Symes of BroadwayWorld.com described Holmes' book as accurately capturing "the angst and drive and occasional hopelessness that these kids must be feeling on a daily basis" and Gomes' music as a "bright beacon that shines." Commenting on its relevance, Symes noted that "It could well be a new requirement-all high school theatre groups shall have Ranked in their catalog, like a modern-day Grease."

The UC Davis Ground and Field production received three 2019 BroadwayWorld Regional Awards for Sacramento: Mindy Cooper for Best Direction of a Musical (non-professional), Chloe Boyan for Best Actress in a Musical or Play (non-professional) and the entire production for Best Musical (non-professional).

References

American musicals
2019 musicals
Original musicals